Juan Luis Maurás (18 June 1922 – 22 November 2017) was a Chilean lawyer and politician who was President of the Senate (1966) and the Chamber of Deputies (1958).

Death
Maurás died on 22 November 2017 in Antofagasta, aged 95.

References

1922 births
2017 deaths
Presidents of the Senate of Chile
Presidents of the Chamber of Deputies of Chile
Members of the Chamber of Deputies of Chile
Members of the Senate of Chile
Grand Crosses with Star and Sash of the Order of Merit of the Federal Republic of Germany
Politicians from Santiago